Joaquín Moya Rodríguez (21 January 1932 – 27 May 2011) was a Spanish fencer. He competed in the individual foil and team épée events at the 1960 Summer Olympics.

Notes

References

External links
 

1932 births
2011 deaths
Spanish male foil fencers
Olympic fencers of Spain
Fencers at the 1960 Summer Olympics
People from Alcalá de Henares
Sportspeople from the Community of Madrid
Fencers from Madrid
Spanish male épée fencers